Anna Colonna (1601–1658) was an Italian noblewoman of the Colonna and Barberini families. She was also the Princess of Paliano.

Early life

Colonna was born in 1601; the daughter of  Filippo Colonna, Prince of Paliano, and Lucrezia Tomacelli, of Galatro, and was thus Princess of Paliano.

On 14 October 1627, at age 26, she married Taddeo Barberini, Prince of Palestrina (later Prefect of Rome) who was two years her junior. The marriage was celebrated by Barberini's uncle, Pope Urban VIII at Castel Gandolfo. At the castle, a coat of arms was erected which merged the heraldic bees of the Barberini with the single column of the Colonna.

In Rome

As the wife of the secular patriarch of the pope's family in Rome, Colonna became one of the most powerful women in the city and in the surrounding Papal States. This is reflected in the personal wealth she and Barberini amassed during Urban's reign; a pontificate known for its unabashed nepotism. Her status was also made clear by the manner in which she was treated by her peers. In 1634, when crowds were assembled for a tournament at the Piazza Navona, her place is described in the following terms:<ref>"Donna Costanza Barberini" likely refers to Colonna's mother-in-law Costanza Magalotti, wife of Carlo Barberini.</ref>

The event was held in honour of the 1634 visit to Rome of Prince Alexander Charles Vasa of Poland and the Piazza was decorated with tapestries of gold and silver. Colonna distributed  diamonds and other prizes to winning tournament entrants.

Botanist Giovanni Baptista Ferrari spent a significant amount of time working in the gardens established by Colonna's brother-in-law, Cardinal Francesco Barberini. The second edition of his botany reference book, De Florum Cultura'', was dedicated to Colonna in 1638. Colonna was also a patron of botanical artist, Giovanna Garzoni.

Barberini exile

After the death of Pope Urban VIII, newly elected Pamphili Pope Innocent X launched an investigation into the Barberini's handling of funds during the Wars of Castro. Colonna's husband, Taddeo, and his brothers, cardinals Francesco Barberini and Antonio Barberini went into exile in Paris with the support of Cardinal Jules Mazarin. Mazarin was the uncle of Marie Mancini; wife of Colonna's nephew Lorenzo Onofrio Colonna and a confidant of Colonna's brother, Cardinal Girolamo Colonna. Mazarin had also served as infantry captain under Colonna's father,  Filippo Colonna.

In 1646, Colonna joined her husband and children in Paris but not before making a passionate appeal (in person) to the Pope, urging him not to strip the Barberini of their assets. The Pope agreed and, though he paid some debts out of the Barberini estate, left the Barberini alone.

While in Paris, Colonna had developed a close friendship with Anne of Austria, Regent of France (wife of former King Louis XIII of France). When Taddeo died in 1647, Anne urged Colonna to stay in France but Colonna chose return to Rome.

Return to Rome

In 1653, with the assistance of Olimpia Maidalchini (who was keen to curry favour with Colonna's cardinal brothers-in-law), she arranged the marriage of her 22-year-old son Maffeo Barberini to Maidalchini's 12-year-old granddaughter (Pope Innocent's grand-niece), Olimpia Giustiniani. The marriage resolved many problems at once, reconciling the Barberini and Pamphili families; allowing the remaining Barberini exiles to return to Rome and ensuring the continuation of the Barberini family line.

Having returned to Rome, Colonna also planned to build a convent and chapel in honour of the Blessed Virgin Mary, Regina Coeli. To fund the project she appealed to her eldest son, Cardinal Carlo Barberini, for access to part her dowry, which had been substantial and had included the comune of Palestrina, which provided a substantive basis for the hereditary Barberini principality. However, her son declined her request and she was forced to seek funds from her brother, Girolamo.

Colonna died in 1658 and was buried at the grounds of the convent.

Family

Colonna and Barberini had five children:

Lucrezia Barberini (1628–1699) who married Francesco I d'Este and became Duchess of Modena.
Camilla Barberini (1629–1631) who died in infancy
Carlo Barberini (1630–1704) who became a Cardinal
Maffeo Barberini (1631–1685) future Prince of Palestrina
Niccolò Maria Barberini (1635–1699)

References and notes

1601 births
1658 deaths
Anna
Barberini family
17th-century Italian women
17th-century Italian nobility
Princesses of Taranto